Argyrotaenia dispositana is a species of moth of the family Tortricidae. It is found in Colombia, Ecuador (the provinces of Sucumbíos, Cotopaxi, Bolivar, Pichincha and Carchi) and Peru.

References

Moths described in 1877
dispositana
Moths of South America